The "G-1" military flight jacket is the commonly accepted name for the fur-lined-collar World War II-era leather flight jacket of the United States Navy, Marine Corps, and Coast Guard. A similar jacket used by the United States Army Air Corps/United States Army Air Forces was usually called the A-2 jacket.

Usage
The G-1 remains a current uniform-issue item in naval aviation for officer and enlisted aviation personnel on flying status in the U.S. Navy, U.S. Marine Corps and U.S. Coast Guard (i.e., Naval Aviator, Naval Flight Officer, Naval Flight Surgeon, Naval Aircrewman, etc.) and was featured as the leather flight jacket worn by Tom Cruise in the film Top Gun.

Development prior to 1947
The G1 jacket can trace its history back to the M-422 jacket, which was brought into use by the U.S. Navy in the 1930s, originally standardised by the U.S. Navy's Bureau of Aeronautics on 28th March 1940 as the M-422, the lengthening of the sleeves by one inch, the internal bi-swing elastic increased from 3/4 inch to 1 inch, and 7 lines of stitches added to the collar to add rigidity, warranted the change of spec to M-422A on the 1st October 1941. This jacket shared the double button pocket design and the mouton fur collar of later designs, but was a bulkier cut which was also longer in the body and normally had a salmon red lining.

In 1942 the M-422A jacket,was replaced by the US Navy by the visually similar AN-6552/AN-J-3A (the latter sometimes being made in horsehide) in an attempt to streamline production between the services as a war economy measure. The AN-J-3 (an AN-6552 without a fur collar and made in horsehide) also replaced the Army Air Forces A-2 jacket, although it was not widely issued. There was also a light weight AN-6551/AN-J-2 and a heavy weight AN-6553/ANJ-4 with the latter being the only one widely adopted by the USAAF.

The M422A jackets and their Second World War compatriots are not commonly seen with patches beyond name, qualification, and service on the left breast. By exception there is sometimes a single squadron badge on the right breast, but not to the level seen on the post war jackets.

Since 1947
In 1947, the US Navy introduced the first G1 jacket which can be correctly named as such: the 55-J-14 jacket. The 55-J-14 was called the G1 on its specification label. It shared the hallmarks of the original M422 jacket, but was shorter in the body so that it didn't bunch up when aircrew were sat down. This was the jacket more commonly seen during the Korean War. It retained the USN stamp in white lettering on the back of the collar from the M422a, and was the only G1 to do so.

The MIL-J-7823(AER) which was introduced in 1950 is the ancestor of the G1 still issued today. This was the first to have USN stamped on the wind flap. This jacket evolved through to the D model (which was the last to have a black specification label) before the introduction of the E model in 1971. The E deviated by allowing synthetic materials to be used in the collar, and stamped cowhide rather than goatskin to be used in the outer.

After the Second World War, it became common for G1 jackets to be adorned with patches earned during a pilot's career. Patches include types of aircraft flown, milestones in carrier landings or total flying hours, and deployments or cruises carried out on certain ships.

For a very brief period from 1979 until early 1981, issuance of the G-1 to new USN, USMC, and USCG flight crew personnel (i.e., officer flight students and newly designated enlisted Naval Aircrewman) was discontinued as a budgetary economy action, with those personnel being issued summer weight green Nomex flight jackets identical to those issued to their U.S. Air Force counterparts. Replacement of worn-out G-1 jackets for extant Naval Aviation personnel was also discontinued during this period. This action was reversed by Secretary of the Navy action in early 1981, and those USN, USMC, and USCG flight-crew personnel who had not received G-1 jackets were issued one retroactively.

Modifications to USN, USMC, and USCG uniform regulations in the 1990s reduced the type and number of permissible insignia on the G-1, but concurrently permitted wear of the G-1 jacket off base with service uniforms.

Commercial exploitation
Commercial versions of the jacket have been available on the consumer market. Official military suppliers which also sold similar spec jackets to the public include Cockpit USA, Cooper Sportswear, Orchard M/C, Brill Bros, Schott, and Excelled. After the success of the 1986 film Top Gun, shopping-mall leather stores carried a variety of G-1 variants. These are new production and come in goatskin and cowhide varieties stamped USN, USCG, or USMC. Jackets are offered by many companies for the civilian market, including US Authentic Mfg. Co., Lost Worlds, Gibson and Barnes, Eastman, US Wings and Bill Kelso Mfg.

Specifications
The military specifications under which the naval flight jackets were made, in the order of latest to earliest, are 
MIL-J-7823E (AS) 1971
MIL-J-7823D (WP) 1966
MIL-J-7823C (WEP) 1962
MIL-J-7823B (WEP) 1960
MIL-J-7823A (AER) 1959
MIL-J-7823 (AER) 1950
55-J-14 (AER) 1947
AN-J3A 1943
AN 6552 1943
M-422A 1941
M-422 1940

The first Navy designation of "G-1" came under the 55-J-14 specification.

The earlier jackets were constructed of goatskin and had a real mouton collar. Current model issue jackets (although there are exceptions) are constructed of cowhide and have a synthetic collar.

Manufacturers
The makers of the Navy's jackets of the above specifications, in rough chronological order from the current supplier to pre-WWII include
 Excelled Sheepskin & Leather Coat Co., Current
 Pharr Brand Name Apparel (2004-current supplier)
 Excelled Sheepskin & Leather Coat Co., 1999–2004
 Schott Bros., 1998
 Cooper Sportswear Mfg. Co., 1989–1996
 Brill Bros., 1968–1987
 Orchard M/C Dist., 1986
 Ferguson of Oklahoma, 1976
 Imperial Leather & Sportswear, 1976
 Imperial Fashions, 1974
 The Martin Lane, Co., 1968–1969
 Gregory Sportswear, 1967
 Irvin B. Foster Sportswear Co., 1962–1963
 Star Sportswear Mfg. Corp., 1964–1967
 Irvin B. Foster & Sons Sportswear Co., 1961
 Ralph Edwards Sportswear, 1961–1964
 Breier of Amsterdam, 1960
 California Sportswear Company, 1960
 Cagleco Sportswear, 1957
 J.A. Dubow Sporting Goods Corp.
 Werber Sportswear
 A. Pritzker & Sons
 Aviators Clothing Co.
 B.-G.
 Star Sportswear Mfg. Co., Lynn, Mass.
 Burjac Sportswear
 L.W. Foster Sportswear Co.
 Arnoff Mfg. Company
 American Sportswear Co.
 Bogen & Tenenbaum
 Edmund T. Church Co.
 Fried, Osterman Co.
 Gordon & Ferguson Co.
 H. & L. Block
 Willis and Geiger
 Monarch Mfg. Company
 Mentor Jackets, Peru
 US Wings, Hudson Ohio
 Leathercraft Sportswear, Elizabeth, New Jersey
 Flying Equipment Co., Chicago, Ill.

See also
 Flight jacket
 A-2 jacket
 B-32 jacket
 MA-1 bomber jacket
 MA-2 bomber jacket

References

United States military uniforms
Jackets
United States Air Force uniforms
Military equipment introduced in the 1930s